Charles Sumner Frost (May 31, 1856 – December 11, 1931) was an American architect. He is best known as the architect of Navy Pier and for designing over 100 buildings for the Chicago and North Western Railway.

Biography
Born in Lewiston, Maine, Frost was first a draftsman in Boston, and graduated from the Massachusetts Institute of Technology in 1876. While working in Boston he worked for the firm of Peabody and Stearns from 1876 to 1881. He moved to Chicago in 1882, when he began a partnership with Henry Ives Cobb. Together, they established the firm Cobb and Frost, which was active from 1882 to 1898. After the partnership ended, he worked alone. Frost married Mary Hughitt, a daughter of Marvin Hughitt, the President of the Chicago and North Western Railroad, in 1897. On January 1, 1898, he partnered with his brother-in-law, Alfred Hoyt Granger, to form the firm of Frost and Granger. Frost and Granger were known for their designs of train stations and terminals, including the now-demolished Chicago and North Western Terminal. Frost designed 127 buildings for the Chicago and North Western Railroad alone. After Frost and Granger dissolved in 1910, Frost continued to work independently, designing such structures as the Navy Pier Auditorium.
  Frost was a Fellow of the American Institute of Architects. He retired on December 31, 1928, and died on December 11, 1931, in Chicago. The city of Frost, Rome Township, Faribault County, Minnesota, was named for Charles S. Frost.

Notable buildings

Union Depot, 201 South Main Street, Leavenworth, Kansas, 1888 (with Cobb)
Chicago and North Western Railway Lake Front Depot, Wisconsin Avenue, Milwaukee, Wisconsin, 1889, demolished 1968
Morgan Park Library (George C. Walker Branch Library) in Chicago, 1889-90
Adams Memorial Library in Wheaton, Illinois, 1891
The Second Union Station, Omaha, Nebraska, 1891
Western Bank Note Building in Chicago in 1891
Fond du Lac Chicago and Northwestern Railroad Depot, Fond du Lac, Wisconsin, 1891
Chicago and North Western Railway station, 200 North 6th Street, De Kalb, Illinois, 1891 (with Granger)
Chicago and North Western Railway station, 724 Green Bay Road, Glencoe, Illinois, 1891
Chicago and North Western Railway depot, Broad Street, Lake Geneva, 1891
Chicago and North Western Railway depot, Milwaukee Avenue, South Milwaukee, Wisconsin, 1893
Maine State Building, 1893 for the World's Columbian Exposition

Old Law Building, Madison, Wisconsin 1893
Chicago and North Western Railway depot, Belle Plaine, Iowa 1894
Richard T. Ely House in Madison, 1896
Chicago and North Western Railway depot, North West and West 5th Streets, Carroll, Iowa, 1896
Oconomowoc Milwaukee Road depot, 115 Collins Street, Oconomowoc, Wisconsin, 1896
Milwaukee Road Passenger Depot in Green Bay, 1898 (Frost & Granger)
Milwaukee Road Depot, 201 3rd Street South, Minneapolis, Minnesota, 1899
Chicago and North Western Railway station, Western Avenue, Lake Forest, Illinois, 1899 (Frost & Granger)
Chicago and North Western Railway depot, 200 Dousman Street, Green Bay, Wisconsin, 1899 (Frost & Granger)
Union Depot, 417 Chapple Avenue, Ashland, Wisconsin, 1900
Chicago and North Western Railway depot, 526 Main Street, Ames, Iowa, 1900
Chicago, Milwaukee and St. Paul Railway Company Passenger Depot, 127 South Spring Street, Beaver Dam, Wisconsin, 1900 (Frost & Granger)
Rock Island Lines Passenger Station, 5th Avenue at 31st Street, Rock Island, Illinois, 1901 (Frost & Granger)
Chicago and North Western Railway depot, Racine, Wisconsin, 1901 (Frost & Granger)
LaSalle Street Station, 1902 (Frost & Granger)
Chicago and North Western Railway station, Oak Street Northwest, Sleepy Eye, Minnesota, 1902 (Frost & Granger)
West Madison Depot, Chicago, Milwaukee, and St. Paul Railway, 640 West Washington Avenue, Madison, Wisconsin, 1903 (Frost & Granger)
Chicago and Northwest Railroad Passenger Station, Watertown, Wisconsin, 1903
Lake Bluff station, Lake Bluff, Illinois, 1904 (Frost & Granger)
Chicago and North Western Depot, Railroad Street, Reedsburg, Wisconsin, 1905 (Frost & Granger)
Chicago and North Western Railway station, Main Street, Breda, Iowa, 1907 (Frost & Granger)
Norwood Park station, Norwood Park, Illinois, 1907 (Frost & Granger)
Chicago and North Western Railway depot, Antigo, Wisconsin, 1907 (Frost & Granger)
St. Luke's Hospital Complex in Chicago, 1908 (with Granger), 1439 S. Michigan/1440 S. Indiana
Chicago and North Western Railway Power House, Chicago, 1909 (Frost & Granger)
Chicago and North Western Terminal, 1911 (with Granger)
Electric Railway Chambers, Winnipeg, Manitoba, 1912
Minneapolis Great Northern Depot, 1913
Chicago and North Western Railway station, Glen Ellyn, Illinois, 1914
Navy Pier Auditorium in Chicago, 1916
Railroad and Bank Building, 176 East 5th Street, St. Paul, Minnesota, 1916 
Chicago and North Western Railway Ore Dock Office, Ashland, Wisconsin, 1916
Chicago and North Western Railway passenger station, Springfield, Minnesota, 1916
Union Depot, St. Paul, Minnesota, 1917
Chicago and North Western Railway depot, Eagle River, Wisconsin, 1923

See also
Architecture of Chicago
Cobb and Frost
Frost & Granger
Lake Forest Library
Lake Forest, Illinois

References

1856 births
1931 deaths
Architects from Maine
American railway architects
Chicago and North Western Railway
People from Lewiston, Maine
Massachusetts Institute of Technology alumni